Korea Tourism College is a college located in Icheon, South Korea.

References

External links 
 Official website 

Icheon
Tourism in South Korea
Universities and colleges in Gyeonggi Province
Educational institutions established in 1950
1950 establishments in South Korea